Eros Correa (born January 13, 1993) is an American professional boxer. As an amateur, he competed at the 2011 World Championships.

He was the number one rated amateur boxer at flyweight in the U.S. prior to his pro debut on March 28, 2017.

Amateur career
Correa won the 2010 PAL Championships at the Oxnard Convention Center in Oxnard, California.

References

External links

Living people
1993 births
American male boxers
Super-bantamweight boxers
American boxers of Mexican descent
Boxers from California
Sportspeople from San Jose, California